Racławice is a village in Lesser Poland Voivodeship, site of the Battle of Racławice (1794).

Racławice may also refer to:
Racławice, Gorlice County in Lesser Poland Voivodeship (south Poland)
Racławice, Kraków County in Lesser Poland Voivodeship (south Poland)
Racławice, Subcarpathian Voivodeship (south-east Poland)
Racławice Śląskie in Opole Voivodeship (south Poland)
Racławice, Greater Poland Voivodeship (west-central Poland)

See also
Battle of Racławice
Racławice Panorama